Quintavalle may refer to:

 Antonio Quintavalle (1688 – c.1724), Italian opera composer
 Bernard of Quintavalle (died 1241), son of Berardello, one of the first followers of St. Francis of Assisi
 Giulia Quintavalle (born 1983), Italian judoka

See also 
 Quintavalla